is a video game for the Sony PlayStation, released in 1995 and published by Sony Computer Entertainment America. It was re-released on the PlayStation Network in Japan on April 26, 2007. One of the earliest PlayStation games, it was met with mediocre reviews, with most critics assessing its graphics as dull and its gameplay as primitive.

Story
A recently colonized alien planet named Planet 220 reports a devastating attack by an unknown force and requires assistance. Alpha and Bravo teams are called in, but after enemy contact is made, the team fails to respond. The player assumes the roles of D3, a rookie pilot, as well as his commander and Charlie squadron Commander Nicolard Michau. Each are piloting the latest space fighter ships, the F/A-37 Strega, in an attempt to neutralize the unknown threat. However, a horrible secret hidden in the battle awaits them.

Gameplay
Philosoma plays like many scrolling shooters with the noticeable difference of its multiple perspectives. The camera switches several times during various levels from a vertical/top-down perspective to a rail shooter perspective (which is often reversed), to a horizontal scrolling perspective and an isometric scrolling perspective. The player ships have four weapons that can be upgraded thrice as well as side-arms consisting of homing missiles and rockets.

Development
Philosoma was one of the first games announced for the PlayStation. It suffered a prolonged development cycle with its release date being pushed back multiple times, before finally appearing in Japan at the end of June 1995.

Reception

On release, Famicom Tsūshin scored the game a 27 out of 40. Scary Larry of GamePro criticized the primitive gameplay, saying that "Philosoma tries hard to be a next-gen shooter, but in gameplay it barely surpasses Novastorm." He further remarked that while the FMVs are impressive, the graphics which are most important to the shooter experience - the backgrounds, explosions, and enemies - are all dull. He nonetheless gave the game a mild recommendation for shooter fans. Rich Leadbetter of Maximum made all the same remarks, calling the FMVs impressive but the gameplay visuals "dull", and saying that the "gameplay [harks] back to an archaic age". He concluded that even the retro release Gradius Deluxe Pack is a far better purchase. Like GamePro, Next Generation deemed the game a worthwhile purchase for shooter fans but no one else: "The graphics and sound really do nothing to take advantage of the advancing technology. If you want the next great experience in gameplay and graphics, Philosoma wouldn't even make a top 75 list. ... Still, there's plenty of explosions, balanced gameplay, fluid control, timely power-ups, and multiple weapon choices to keep any shooter fan happy." Philosoma was awarded Best Shooter of 1995 by Electronic Gaming Monthly.

Sequel
In 2001, a sequel was released in Japan only for the PlayStation 2 called Phase Paradox. However, it was only a sequel in terms of it being a continuation of the storyline from Philosoma; the game was in the survival horror genre instead of a shooter genre.

Notes

References

1995 video games
PlayStation (console) games
PlayStation Network games
Science fiction video games
Scrolling shooters
Rail shooters
Sony Interactive Entertainment games
Video games scored by Kow Otani